Unió Esportiva Vilajuïga, S.A.D. was a Spanish football team based in Vilajuïga, Province of Girona, in the autonomous community of Catalonia. Founded in 2007 it played its last season in 3ª - Group 5, holding home matches at Estadi Municipal de Vilajuïga, with a capacity of 2,500 spectators.

History
UE Vilajuïga was founded in 1919 as UE Figueres. On 27 June 2007 the club's main shareholder transferred the team to Castelldefels and renamed it UE Miapuesta Castelldefels, with the historical UE Castelldefels now serving as the reserve team.

In 2007–08 the club played its first season in the third division, being relegated immediately. It was then moved to Vilajuïga, renamed Unió Esportiva Vilajuïga and started competing in the fourth level, being dissolved after only one year.

Club background
Unió Esportiva MiApuesta Castelldefels – (2007–08)
Unió Esportiva Vilajuïga – (2008–09)

Season to season
Miapuesta Castelldefels

UE Vilajuiga

1 season in Segunda División B
1 season in Tercera División

Famous players
 Martín Posse
 Jordi Masip
 Víctor Rodríguez
 Zou Feddal

References

Defunct football clubs in Catalonia
Association football clubs established in 2007
Association football clubs disestablished in 2009
2007 establishments in Catalonia
2009 disestablishments in Spain